Husein "Huse" Madhavji (pronounced Ma-dav-gee; born July 19) is a Canadian actor and television personality. He is best known for his role as Dr. Shahir Hamza on the medical drama Saving Hope and as the former face of Star! Canada’s Entertainment Channel.

Madhavji’s roles as an actor include playing Ruptal 1 on HBO Canada's Call Me Fitz and  Lt. Col. Max Prakash in Combat Hospital. Husein goes by the name "Huse".

Hosting

Madhavji grew up in London, Ontario in an Indian Gujarati family who were Ismailis. After graduating from the radio and television arts program at Ryerson University Madhavji moved to Winnipeg, Manitoba to take on his first on-air position as an anchor/reporter for A-Channel.  From there he moved to Northern California and was a live feature reporter for a short lived show called Good Evening Sacramento before making the jump to Good Day Sacramento for KMAX-TV. After less than two years working in Northern California, Madhavji received a call from CHUM Limited to host Star!’s flagship show Star! Daily in Toronto. Madhavji co- hosted the national program with television personality Dina Pugliese. Together they teamed up fronting various specials including Canada’s New Year’s Eve Bash. In 2007 CTV Globemedia acquired CHUM, and replaced Star! Daily with their own daily entertainment show etalk.  Madhavji became a reporter for etalk, continued to front various specials on Star! and joined CP24, a round the clock local news channel in Toronto as their entertainment specialist  until CTV decided to stop all production on Star! due to the economic downturn in Canada.

Madhavji continues to host various live events including AKF's "The World Partnership Walk" in Toronto and "Miss India Canada".

Acting

Madhavji took a keen interest in theatre in high school, performing in various musicals and plays. He was ready to attend theatre school but was directed towards broadcasting by his parents since it was a more stable than a career in theatre. Throughout Madhavji’s hosting career, he never let go of his creative roots. He was cast in the Winnipeg production of Joseph and the Technicolored Dreamcoat, but had to turn it down after his News Director rejected his request for time off. Madhavji did land a few reporter roles during his time working in Winnipeg and Sacramento, most notably in the feature films The Many Trials of Jane Doe and Gone, But Not Forgotten. He decided to give acting a proper shot when he moved back to Toronto. While hosting at Star!, Madhavji moonlighted as a stage actor in the South Asian comedy 30 Dates. After securing a film/TV agent, Madhavji got cast in the CBC pilot Throwing Stones.  When Madhavji’s hosting career at Star! ended in 2008, he went on tour with the cast of 30 Dates, was cast in the CTV/CBS cop drama The Bridge and then as a reoccurring character Ruptal 1 in the HBO Canada/Direct-TV comedy Call Me Fitz opposite Jason Priestley. Madhavji was seen in the crime thriller Cold Blooded, Combat Hospital and the second  season of Call Me Fitz.

As of June 7, 2012, Madhavji stars on  supernatural medical drama Saving Hope as Dr. Shahir Hamza.

Filmography

References

External links

Year of birth missing (living people)
Living people
Canadian male film actors
Canadian male television actors
Canadian male voice actors
Canadian television personalities
Canadian Ismailis
Canadian people of Indian descent